The 2012–13 Ligue Magnus season was the 92nd season of the Ligue Magnus, the top level of ice hockey in France. 14 teams participated in the league, and the Dragons de Rouen won the championship. The Scorpions de Mulhouse were relegated to the FFHG Division 1.

Regular season

Playoffs

Relegation
 Scorpions de Mulhouse - Drakkars de Caen 0:3 (2:3 SO, 1:6, 0:2)

External links
 Season on hockeyfrance.com

1
Fra
Ligue Magnus seasons